The Sakanashi Tunnel (坂梨トンネル Sakanashi Tonneru) is a tunnel on the border of Akita Prefecture and Aomori Prefecture on the Tōhoku Expressway. The tunnel crosses Sakanashi Pass of the northern Ōu Mountain Range. Its  northbound tunnel is the longest tunnel on the Tōhoku Expressway. Its completion in 1986 was one of the final pieces of the  Tōhoku Expressway from Tokyo to Aomori.

Description
The speed limit in the tunnel is set at 70 km/h. The tunnel is the longest on the Tōhoku Expressway.

Alternate route
Prior to the opening of the tunnel the primary high-speed route from Morioka to Aomori was the Michinoku Toll Road. That route is currently being extended to relieve National Route 4 and the Tōhoku Expressway of traffic from Hachinohe to Aomori, via the Hachinohe Expressway, Second Michinoku Toll Road, and Kamikita Expressway. National Route 282 runs parallel to the tunnel, but winds through the mountain pass.

History 
The Sakanahi Tunnel opened on 30 July 1986. This allowed the expressway to open between Kazuno, Akita and Hirakawa, Aomori.

References

Road tunnels in Japan
Tunnels completed in 1986
1986 establishments in Japan
Tōhoku Expressway
Roads in Akita Prefecture
Roads in Aomori Prefecture